Xylotrechus nunenmacheri is a species of beetle in the family Cerambycidae. It was described by Van Dyke in 1920.

References

Xylotrechus
Beetles described in 1920